Biddle may refer to:

 Biddle (surname)
 Biddle family, American family
 Biddle Motor Car Company, brass era automobile company based in Philadelphia
 Biddle, Montana, United States, a census-designated place 
 Biddle Island (Indiana), United States
 Biddle Street, Baltimore, Maryland, United States
 Biddle Street, Yatton, biological site in England
 , several United States Navy ships
 Biddle University, historical name of Johnson C. Smith University
 Biddle Memorial Hall, Johnson C. Smith University, Charlotte, North Carolina
 Biddle House (disambiguation)